Acacia brockii is a tree belonging to the genus Acacia and the subgenus, Phyllodineae, in the family Fabaceae, and is endemic to the Northern Territory.

Description
Acacia brockii is a slender tree growing to 5 metres, with silvery-grey foliage.

Acacia brockii is distinguished from other Northern Territory Acacias by its flattened hairs on its phyllodes which fall off, its fringed bracteoles  with acute apices which extend beyond the flower buds, and by the fine, long, silvery hairs on its calyces.

Type specimen
The type specimen was collected in Kakadu National Park on April 21, 1990 by A.V. Slee & L.A. Craven (#2694), with holotypes, NSW 236231, MEL 1617292A, PERTH 3347060 and elsewhere.

Etymology
The specific epithet, brockii, honours John Brock, the Northern Territory author and botanical consultant who first collected this species.

See also
 List of Acacia species

References

External links
Acacia brockii World Wide Wattle

brockii
Flora of the Northern Territory
Plants described in 1992
Taxa named by Mary Douglas Tindale